Charlie Copeland may refer to:
 Charles L. Copeland, American politician
 Charlie Copeland (footballer), English footballer

See also
 Charles Copeland (disambiguation)